Ismail Industries Limited is a Pakistani confectionery and snack food manufacturer which owns AstroPack, CandyLand, Bisconni and SnackCity brands.

History
The company was founded in 1988.

In 2015, the company's director and CEO was Maqsood Ismail.

Brands
 CandyLand
 Bisconni
 SnackCity

Factories
The company currently operates three factories in the following cities:
 Hub, Balochistan
 Lahore
 Karachi

References

External links
Ismail Industries Limited - official website

Pakistani brands
Food and drink companies established in 1988
Food manufacturers of Pakistan
Companies listed on the Pakistan Stock Exchange
Pakistani companies established in 1988